Álvaro Torres-Calderón (born 1975) is a Peruvian poet.

Biography 
Torres-Calderón was born in Peru in 1975. He has been recognized as member of a new generation of poets in his country. His book of poems Claroscuro talks about his childhood, adolescence and questions about life. It has references to magical beings such as angels, demons and fairies.

He is also a lawyer and studied in his native country and in Spain. Torres-Calderón received his doctorate in literature and Romance languages in the United States.

Torres-Calderón has participated in the publication of the book Alejo Carpentier Ante la Crítica, Caracas: Monte Avila, 2005, with his article "Alejo Carpentier y el Hombre Fronterizo: Una Constante en el Reino de Este Mundo". He also published in the U.S. a set of poems called Spells at the Stonepile Writers Anthology from the North Georgia College & State University Press in November 2010. He has contributed to the Peruvian literary journal Tinta Expresa with the article "Nación, Identidad y Frontera en la Prosa de Clorinda Matto de Turner". Torres-Calderón has participated in several national and international literary conferences as well as interviews in Peruvian newspapers and a radio presentation of his creative works (December 2010). He has performed and assisted in many theatrical works at college and university level and performed musically at the same level. His interests include Integration Law, Latin-American female writers of the 19th century, José Martí, and Latin American civilization.

References 

Living people
1975 births
21st-century Peruvian poets
Peruvian male poets
21st-century male writers